ERT World (formerly ERT SAT) is a Greek free-to-air television channel owned and operated by state-owned public broadcaster Hellenic Broadcasting Corporation. It is the corporation's international television service, and its programming includes a mix of news, discussion-based programmes, drama, documentaries, entertainment shows as well as sports coverage including live games from Greece's top football league, Super League Greece.

As of June 12, 2013, was disestablished under an order of the Greek Government, as part of austerity measures, along with all of ERT's former TV and radio channels; ET1, NET, ET3, ERT World and the radios ceased to operate from the morning of Wednesday 12 June. As of 3 May 2016, ERT world broadcasts again on Europe.

ERT World created a special program consisting of the best programmes from the three national channels, ERT1, ERT2 and ERT3, and its own specialized programs targeted at the global promotion of Greece. It also used to air programs from Cyprus Broadcasting Corporation (the Cypriot public broadcaster) but discontinued the practice.

Programming is split into two zones - weekday and weekend. On weekdays one can find standard news and information as well as some entertainment shows. On the weekend the focus is mainly on entertainment and sports.

In early 2006, the Hellenic Broadcasting Corporation revealed that ERT SAT would be undergoing a major overhaul to allow it to better meet the needs of Greeks abroad. Among the changes are new programmes designed specifically for the Omogeneia (Greek expatriates) and a localized schedule to serve each of the newly designated program 'zones' - North America, Europe/Africa and Asia/Australia. The new program zones were to be launched in the fall of 2006 but as of March 2013 had yet to materialize as the channel still aired programs according to local time in Greece (UTC+2).

In August 2010, ERT announced that they had initiated a public bidding process to award the worldwide distribution rights for ERT World. The current rights holder, Comart Telecom declined to renew their agreement with ERT and on August 30, 2010, it was announced that PCCW Global would be awarded the distribution rights temporarily for 1 year until the bidding process was completed and a decision made on the rights holder.

As of March 2013, the distribution rights are held by KBI Implus Hellas. On 11 June 2013, the channel and all the channels of the ERT group were brutally cut shortly before 11 pm (local time). If the terrestrial channels (ERT1, ERT2 and ERT3) resume their broadcasts on 11 June 2015, it is still almost a year before the satellite version of Greek public television resumes broadcasting on the Hot Bird satellite on 3 May 2016 in Europe.

Programming

Original ERT World programming
Apo Tin Australia Me Agapi - weekly magazine, features news and stories about the Greek diaspora in Australia. Hosted by Alekos Markellos & Emma Emmanuel.
Odysseia (Odyssey) - new program created specifically for ERT World, deals with the Omogenia. Features community news from various Greek communities around the world, issues regarding the initiatives and events of the diaspora, problems facing those living abroad regarding connecting with the homeland and live reports from cities and communities of the Greek diaspora. Hosted by Dora Anagnostopoulou.
Elliniko Panorama (Hellenic Panorama) - newsmagazine designed specifically for viewers of ERT World that aims to present to viewers the face of Hellenism. A look at the new generation and how they are shaping the Greece of tomorrow, discussion with Hellenes abroad and reports on key individuals. Now in its 4th year, hosted by Irini Nikolopoulou.
NEWS4U - daily English language news bulletin.
Tekmiria Ellinismou - documentary series.

From former ET3
Αlithina Senaria - informative series that takes the viewer around the world to meet people who excel in their respective jobs. From a businessman on Wall Street to a shepherd in Pindos, from an acclaimed journalist to a hermit in Pilios, these are fascinating people with a story to tell. This program is now in its ninth year and has been the most watched show on ET-3 since its inception. It is hosted by Nikos Aslanidis.
Anikhnéfsis - news magazine with a focus on the Balkan region and the countries that comprise it. It gives an in-depth look at the culture, history and people of this region. Hosted by Pantelis Savvidis.
Diaspora - a series that focuses on bridging the gap between Greeks living abroad and Greece. It gives a voice to the homogeneity, to tell about their way of life, the problems they face, stories about their experiences and more. This show that will inform and entertain viewers the world around is hosted by Xrusa Samou.

Logos

See also
ERT World Canada
Cyprus Broadcasting Corporation

Hellenic Broadcasting Corporation
International broadcasters
Television channels in Greece
Greek-language television stations
Television channels and stations established in 1996
1996 establishments in Greece